The 1994–95 Syracuse Orangemen basketball team represented Syracuse University as a member of the Big East Conference during the 1994–95 NCAA Division I men's basketball season.  The Head coach was Jim Boeheim, serving for his 19th year.  The team played home games at the Carrier Dome in Syracuse, New York.  Syracuse finished with a 20–10 (12–6 Big East) record and advanced to Second Round of the NCAA tournament before losing to eventual National Runner-up Arkansas, 96–94 in overtime.

Roster

Schedule and results

|-
!colspan=9 style=| Regular Season

|-
!colspan=9 style=| Big East tournament

|-
!colspan=9 style=| NCAA tournament

Rankings

References

External links
1994-1995 Syracuse Orangemen at Orangehoops.org

Syracuse Orange
Syracuse Orange men's basketball seasons
Syracuse
Syracuse Orange
Syracuse Orange